Sir John Michael Clifford Higgs DL (30 May 1912 – 20 October 1995) was a  solicitor from Brierley Hill who served as the Conservative Member of Parliament (MP) for Bromsgrove from 1950 to 1955.

Early life and family 
The son of Albert W. Higgs, a solicitor from Lye (then in Worcestershire), Michael Higgs was educated at Shrewsbury School and at the University of Birmingham, where he earned his LL.B. He was admitted as a solicitor in 1934. He married twice: first in May 1936 to Diana Louise Jerrams (died 1950), and, secondly, in June 1952, to Rachel Mary Jones, from Pedmore, Stourbridge.

Career 
During World War II  he served with the Royal Artillery from 1939 to 1942, and then from 1942 to 1946 as a member of the Judge Advocate-General's staff.

He was a member of Staffordshire County Council from 1946 to 1949, and of Worcestershire County Council from 1953 to 1973, serving as the chairman of the latter from to 1959 to 1973. He was then chairman of Hereford and Worcester County Council from 1973 to 1977.

He was elected at the 1950 general election as the MP for the newly created Bromsgrove division of Worcestershire. He was re-elected in 1951, and stood down from the House of Commons at the 1955 general election.

He was made a Deputy Lieutenant of Worcestershire in August 1968, and it was announced in the 1969 New Year Honours that he was to be knighted. The knighthood was conferred on 11 February 1969, in Buckingham Palace.

References

External links 
 

1912 births
1995 deaths
Conservative Party (UK) MPs for English constituencies
UK MPs 1950–1951
UK MPs 1951–1955
British Army personnel of World War II
Royal Artillery officers
Knights Bachelor
Politicians awarded knighthoods
Deputy Lieutenants of Worcestershire
People educated at Shrewsbury School
Alumni of the University of Birmingham
Members of Staffordshire County Council
Councillors in Worcestershire
Members of Hereford and Worcester County Council